Bonan, or Bao'an may refer to:

Bonan people
Bonan language

Places
Bonan, Iran
Bönan, Sweden
See also
Jishishan Bonan, Dongxiang and Salar Autonomous County, China
Isaabad-e Sar Bonan, Iran

People
Edmond Bonan (born 1937), French mathematician
Heiko Bonan (born 1966), football coach
Marcelo Bonan (born 1981), Brazilian footballer
Narcisse Bonan (born 1984), Ivorian footballer

See also
Bao'an (disambiguation)